Wild Light is the fifth studio album by 65daysofstatic, released on 16 September 2013 in the UK and Europe and on 29 October 2013 in the United States. It is the band's first album released on the Superball Music label.

Reception

Upon release, Wild Light received generally positive reviews from music critics. At Metacritic, which assigns a normalized rating out of 100 to reviews from mainstream critics, the album received an average score of 82/100 based on 12 reviews.

"The pomp that they derive from taking dour post-rock to a rave - notable here in Prisms - is satisfying," according to Q. "Similarly enjoyable are pyroclastic flows of guitars and electronics as heard in Unmake the Wild Light," concludes reviewer Luke Turner, giving the album a 3/5 rating.

Track listing

References

2013 albums
65daysofstatic albums
Superball Music albums